Allan Hinton (20 July 1930 – 28 July 1987) was a South African cricketer. He played in one first-class match for Border in 1959/60.

See also
 List of Border representative cricketers

References

External links
 

1930 births
1987 deaths
South African cricketers
Border cricketers
Cricketers from Johannesburg